Battle of Kabul may refer to:
Battle of Kabul (709), during the Islamic conquest of Afghanistan
Siege of Kabul (1504), during the campaigns of Babur
Kabul Expedition (1842) (August–October 1842), during the First Anglo-Afghan War
Siege of the Sherpur Cantonment (December 1879), during the Second Anglo-Afghan War
Operation Storm 333 (December 1979), start of the Soviet-Afghan War
Battle of Kabul (1992–96), a series of intermittent fighting and sieges in the period between the collapse of the Communist government in 1992 until the Taliban took control of the city in 1996
Siege of Kabul (2001), when Northern Alliance forces supported by American air power captured the city in 2001
Fall of Kabul (2021) initiated by the Taliban in August of that year as US forces withdrew from their presence of the prior two decades